Jonathan Levin (born November 17, 1972) is an American economist at Stanford University who succeeded Garth Saloner as the dean at Stanford Graduate School of Business on September 1, 2016. He also has an appointment as the Holbrook Working Professor of Price Theory in the Department of Economics at Stanford. He had been Chair of the Economics Department. He was awarded the 2011 John Bates Clark Medal. Since 2021, he has been a member of the President’s Council of Advisors on Science and Technology (PCAST).

He is the son of former Yale University President  Richard Levin.

Academic career
Levin received his BA and BS degrees from Stanford University in 1994, an MPhil in Economics from Nuffield College, Oxford in 1996, and his PhD in Economics from MIT in 1999. He was a post-doctoral scholar at the Cowles Foundation at Yale University, and began teaching at Stanford in 2000. His research is in the field of Industrial Organization.

Professional career
Levin has had numerous professional experiences in the realm of economics, whether in the world of academia or business. He has served on many committees and boards, sharing his expertise with fellow economists and the general public. Additionally, within the education track, he has given back to the next generation of economists as a college professor, eventually leading him to his current role as dean of the Stanford Graduate School of Business.

Awards and honors
Levin has received over a dozen honors and awards. His most esteemed is the previously mentioned John Bates Clark Medal in 2011, which is regarded as the most distinguished economic title after the Nobel Prize. Some of his other notable achievements include:

John Simon Guggenheim Memorial Fellowship, 2014
American Economic Journal: Microeconomics, Best Paper Award, 2014
Kavli Frontiers of Science Symposium, 2006
Alfred P. Sloan Research Fellowship, 2004–2006
George Webb Medley Thesis Prize, Oxford, 1996

Personal background
Levin has a wife and three children, with whom he lives on the Stanford campus south of San Francisco, in Palo Alto.

References

External links
 Website at Stanford University

1972 births
Living people
20th-century American economists
21st-century American economists
Stanford University School of Humanities and Sciences alumni
Stanford University Department of Economics faculty
Fellows of the Econometric Society
Alumni of Nuffield College, Oxford
20th-century American Jews
Business school deans
Fellows of the American Academy of Arts and Sciences
21st-century American Jews